The Sauer S 2700 UL were a 4 stroke aircraft engine for homebuilt aircraft

Design and development
The engine is based on the Wasserboxer. It is extensively modified for aircraft use and all the parts are custom made. These engines are derived from the certified engines produced by the same manufacturer and used in several motorgliders and small aircraft. This particular engine must be one of the largest displacement VW conversions that have been built, but it is unknown if it ever entered production.

Specifications (S 2700 UL)

See also
Sauer engines

References

External links

S2700